Kleeer was an American New York City–based funk, disco and post-disco band, which was formed in 1972 under the name The Jam Band, as a backup group to different disco bands and vocalists.

Members
 Woodrow "Woody" Cunningham (lead vocalist and drummer, died 2010)
 Paul Crutchfield (percussionist and keyboardist)
 Richard Lee (guitarist) 
 Norman Durham (bassist, died 2011)

Career
After a switch to the name Pipeline in 1975, the group also decided to switch to making hard rock instead of disco. Record labels competed to sign them but, when they finally ended up at Columbia Records, their single "Gypsie Rider" did not fare well commercially.

In 1976, they got the opportunity to become The Universal Robot Band along with underground disco producers Patrick Adams and Greg Carmichael. This project was more successful than their former projects. They made the single "Barely Breaking Even" alongside singer Leroy Burgess, and they also recorded an album. The group toured as The Universal Robot Band until 1978. After 1978, the band decided to make all their music themselves under the new name of Kleeer.

Between 1979 and 1985 the group released seven albums and had several hits in the US Billboard Hot 100 and in R&B charts. The most mentionable are "Keep Your Body Workin'", "Tonight's the Night", "Winners", "Intimate Connection", and "Get Tough". The sound was now more focused on 1980s style funk, and electronic instruments, like vocoders and synthesizers.

The System lead singer Mic Murphy was a road manager for the band before the start of his record career.

After the 1985's album Seeekret, the band disappeared for unknown reasons. Most of the musicians continued working with other projects. In the 1990s, however, the group re-formed as Kleeer at some occasions.

Discography

Studio albums

Singles

References

External links
Kleer biography and discography at Discogs.
Six Million Steps – Woody Cunningham/Kleeer Special radio show from November 2010

American dance music groups
American funk musical groups
American soul musical groups
American boogie musicians